Sarikei District is an administrative district in Sarikei Division, Sarawak, Malaysia, covering an area of . The town of Sarikei is the capital of the Sarikei district.

Demography
There has been a marginal growth of Sarikei District population of 1.33% from 1991 to 2000. Meanwhile, from 2000 to 2010, there is a marginal growth of 1.66%.
{| class="wikitable" style="text-align: center;"
! Year
| 1991 || 2000 ||2010
|-
! Totalpopulation
| 42,689 || 48,132 || 56,798
|-
|}

Geography
In July 2010, residents of Sarikei district staying in the rural areas felt a minor tremor in their homes but the cause of the tremor was not found. On 19 April 2019 at 5 am, residents staying at the similar area felt a greater degree of tremor which lasted for a few seconds. According to parameters provided by Indonesian Meteorology, Climatology, and Geophysical Agency, there was an earthquake 27 km south of Sarikei town, with Richter scale of 3.8 with depth of 10 km. However, Sarawak branch of Malaysian Meteorological Department denied any earthquake happened in Sarikei.

Towns and villages

Sarikei
The town of Sarikei houses the Sarikei District Office.

Jakar
The town is notable of its prawn mee and Shumai (Chinese dumpling).

Selalang
Sebangkoi country park and Tanjung Lusam (Lusam cape) are located here.

References